Carlos Ancira (20 August 1929 – 10 October 1987) was a Mexican film actor. He appeared in more than sixty films from 1950 to 1986.

Selected filmography

Awards
TVyNovelas Award for Best First Actor (1986, 1987)

References

External links
 	
	
	

1929 births
1987 deaths
Male actors from Mexico City
Mexican male film actors
Mexican male television actors
20th-century Mexican male actors